Lisa Ann Wen (born 23 April 1965) is a Taiwanese freestyle and butterfly swimmer. She competed in four events at the 1984 Summer Olympics.

References

External links
 

1965 births
Living people
Taiwanese female butterfly swimmers
Taiwanese female freestyle swimmers
Olympic swimmers of Taiwan
Swimmers at the 1984 Summer Olympics
Place of birth missing (living people)